is a railway station in the city of Minamisōma, Fukushima, Japan, operated by East Japan Railway Company (JR East).

Lines

Station layout
The station has two opposed side platforms connected to the station building by a footbridge. The station is Unstaffed.
It became an unstaffed station from March 14, 2020.

Platforms

History
Odaka Station opened on 11 May 1898. The station was absorbed into the JR East network upon the privatization of Japanese National Railways (JNR) on 1 April 1987. The station was closed on 11 March 2011 following the Fukushima Daiichi nuclear disaster.

Passenger statistics
In fiscal 2018, the station was used by an average of 493 passengers daily (boarding passengers only).

Surrounding area
Former Odata Town Hall
Odaka Post Office

See also
 List of railway stations in Japan

References

External links

  

Railway stations in Fukushima Prefecture
Jōban Line
Railway stations in Japan opened in 1898
Stations of East Japan Railway Company
Minamisōma